Syd de Melker (31 March 1884 –  1 November 1953) was a Cape Colony international rugby union player who played as a centre.

He made 2 appearances for South Africa from 1903 - 1906.
Married to notorious female serial killer, Daisy de Melker.

References

Rugby union players from Cape Colony

1884 births
1953 deaths
Rugby union centres

Place of death missing
Griquas (rugby union) players